Miloslav Konopka (born 23 January 1979 in Rimavská Sobota) is a male hammer thrower from Slovakia. His personal best throw is 81.33 metres, achieved in May 2004 in Banská Bystrica.

International competitions

External links

1979 births
Living people
Slovak male hammer throwers
Athletes (track and field) at the 2000 Summer Olympics
Athletes (track and field) at the 2004 Summer Olympics
Athletes (track and field) at the 2008 Summer Olympics
Olympic athletes of Slovakia
Sportspeople from Rimavská Sobota